BMP  may refer to:

Computing
 Basic Multilingual Plane, related to the Unicode character set
 Beep Media Player, an obsolete media player related to XMMS
 BMP file format, an image file format with the extension .bmp
 BGP Monitoring Protocol (RFC 7854), a network protocol for monitoring BGP sessions

Vehicles
 BMP development, a series of Soviet and Russian infantry fighting vehicles
 BMP-1
 BMP-2
 BMP-3
 BMP-23, a Bulgarian infantry fighting vehicle
 BMP UAV, a series of Chinese unmanned aerial vehicles

Medical
 Basic metabolic panel, a common blood test
 Bone morphogenetic proteins, a family of growth factors influencing bone and tissue growth within animals

Other uses
 Besi Merah Putih, a militia group in East Timor
 Best management practice for water pollution, a technical term in environmental management
 BMP Global Distribution Inc v Bank of Nova Scotia, a 2008–2009 case in the Supreme Court of Canada
 BMP Radio, a broadcasting company based in Houston, Texas
 Boase Massimi Pollitt, a former advertising agency in UK
 Stone Beit Midrash Program, an undergraduate Judaic Studies program at Yeshiva University
 Bear Mountain Parkway, a scenic parkway in New York State that connects the Bear Mountain Bridge with Peekskill
 Baoding East railway station, China Railway telegraph code BMP

See also